Turrisipho lachesis is a species of sea snail, a marine gastropod mollusk in the family Colidae, the true whelks and the like.

Description
The length of the shell attains 44.1 mm. The shell is pinkish white under a coriaceous epidermis.

Distribution
Range: 74°N to 46.08°N; 78°W to 0°W. Distribution: Greenland; Greenland: West Greenland, East Greenland; Canada; Canada: Queen Elizabeth Islands ; also off Norway and the Barents Sea

References

External links
 Mörch, O. A. L. (1869). Description de trois Fusus nouveaux du Gröenland. Journal de Conchyliologie. 17(4): 397-399
  Posselt, H.J. (1898) Groenlands Brachiopoder og Bloeddyr. Meddelelser om Groenland, 23, 1–298 pp., 2 pls
 Bouchet, P. & Warén, A. (1985). Revision of the Northeast Atlantic bathyal and abyssal Neogastropoda excluding Turridae (Mollusca, Gastropoda). Bollettino Malacologico. supplement 1: 121-296

Colidae
Gastropods described in 1869